Manuel da Silva Martins (20 January 1927 – 24 September 2017) was a Catholic bishop.

Ordained to the priesthood in 1951, da Silva Martins served as the bishop of the Diocese of Setubal, Portugal from 1975 to 1998.

Notes

1927 births
2017 deaths
People from Setúbal
20th-century Roman Catholic bishops in Portugal